The 42nd United States Congress was a meeting of the legislative branch of the United States federal government, consisting of the United States Senate and the United States House of Representatives. It met in Washington, D.C. from March 4, 1871, to March 4, 1873, during the third and fourth years of Ulysses S. Grant's presidency.  The apportionment of seats in the House of Representatives was based on the 1860 United States census. Both chambers had a Republican majority.

Major events

 June 10, 1871: U.S. Marines make naval attack on the Han River forts in Korea
 March 1, 1872: Yellowstone National Park was established as the world's first national park
 November 5, 1872: 1872 United States presidential election

Major legislation

 April 20, 1871: Enforcement Act of 1871
 March 1, 1872: Yellowstone National Park founded
 May 10, 1872: General Mining Act of 1872
 May 23, 1872: Amnesty Act of 1872
 June 1, 1872: Practice Conformity Act (precursor to the Rules Enabling Act), ch. 255, 
 February 12, 1873: Coinage Act of 1873
 March 3, 1873: Timber Culture Act
 March 3, 1873: Comstock Act
 March 3, 1873: Salary Grab Act (so called)

Party summary 

The count below identifies party affiliations at the beginning of the first session of this Congress, and includes members from vacancies and newly admitted states, when they were first seated. Changes resulting from subsequent replacements are shown below in the "Changes in membership" section.

Senate

House of Representatives

Leadership

Senate 
President:  Schuyler Colfax (R)
President pro tempore: Henry B. Anthony (R)

House of Representatives 
Speaker: James G. Blaine (R)
 Republican Conference Chairman: Austin Blair

Members
This list is arranged by chamber, then by state. Senators are listed in order of seniority, and representatives are listed by district.

Skip to House of Representatives, below

Senate
Senators were elected by the state legislatures every two years, with one-third beginning new six-year terms with each Congress. Preceding the names in the list below are Senate class numbers, which indicate the cycle of their election. In this Congress, Class 1 meant their term began in the last Congress, requiring re-election in 1874; Class 2 meant their term began in this Congress, requiring re-election in 1876; and Class 3 meant their term ended in this Congress, requiring re-election in 1872.

Alabama 
 2. George Goldthwaite (D)
 3. George E. Spencer (R)

Arkansas 
 2. Powell Clayton (R)
 3. Benjamin F. Rice (R)

California 
 1. Eugene Casserly (D)
 3. Cornelius Cole (R)

Connecticut 
 1. William A. Buckingham (R)
 3. Orris S. Ferry (R)

Delaware 
 1. Thomas F. Bayard Sr. (D)
 2. Eli M. Saulsbury (D)

Florida 
 1. Abijah Gilbert (R)
 3. Thomas W. Osborn (R)

Georgia 
 2. Thomas M. Norwood (D), from November 14, 1871
 3. Joshua Hill (R)

Illinois 
 2. John A. Logan (R)
 3. Lyman Trumbull (LR)

Indiana 
 1. Daniel D. Pratt (R)
 3. Oliver H. P. T. Morton (R)

Iowa 
 2. George G. Wright (R)
 3. James Harlan (R)

Kansas 
 2. Alexander Caldwell (R)
 3. Samuel C. Pomeroy (R)

Kentucky 
 2. John W. Stevenson (D)
 3. Garrett Davis (D), until September 22, 1872
 Willis B. Machen (D), from September 27, 1872

Louisiana 
 2. J. Rodman West (R)
 3. William P. Kellogg (R), until November 1, 1872

Maine 
 1. Hannibal Hamlin (R)
 2. Lot M. Morrill (R)

Maryland 
 1. William T. Hamilton (D)
 3. George Vickers (D)

Massachusetts 
 1. Charles Sumner (R)
 2. Henry Wilson (R), until March 3, 1873

Michigan 
 1. Zachariah Chandler (R)
 2. Thomas W. Ferry (R)

Minnesota 
 1. Alexander Ramsey (R)
 2. William Windom (R)

Mississippi 
 1. Adelbert Ames (R)
 2. James L. Alcorn (R), from December 1, 1871

Missouri 
 1. Carl Schurz (R)
 3. Francis P. Blair Jr. (D)

Nebraska 
 1. Thomas Tipton (R)
 2. Phineas Hitchcock (R)

Nevada 
 1. William M. Stewart (R)
 3. James W. Nye (R)

New Hampshire 
 2. Aaron H. Cragin (R)
 3. James W. Patterson (R)

New Jersey 
 1. John P. Stockton (D)
 2. Frederick T. Frelinghuysen (R)

New York 
 1. Reuben Fenton (R)
 3. Roscoe Conkling (R)

North Carolina 
 2. Matt W. Ransom (D), from January 30, 1872
 3. John Pool (R)

Ohio 
 1. Allen G. Thurman (D)
 3. John Sherman (R)

Oregon 
 2. James K. Kelly (D)
 3. Henry W. Corbett (R)

Pennsylvania 
 1. John Scott (R)
 3. Simon Cameron (R)

Rhode Island 
 1. William Sprague (R)
 2. Henry B. Anthony (R)

South Carolina 
 2. Thomas J. Robertson (R)
 3. Frederick A. Sawyer (R)

Tennessee 
 1. William G. Brownlow (R)
 2. Henry Cooper (D)

Texas 
 1. James W. Flanagan (R)
 2. Morgan C. Hamilton (R)

Vermont 
 1. George F. Edmunds (R)
 3. Justin S. Morrill (R)

Virginia 
 1. John F. Lewis (R)
 2. John W. Johnston (D), from March 15, 1871

West Virginia 
 1. Arthur I. Boreman (R)
 2. Henry G. Davis (D)

Wisconsin 
 1. Matthew H. Carpenter (R)
 3. Timothy O. Howe (R)

House of Representatives
The names of members of the House of Representatives are preceded by their district numbers.

Alabama 
 . Benjamin S. Turner (R)
 . Charles W. Buckley (R)
 . William A. Handley (D)
 . Charles Hays (R)
 . Peter M. Dox (D)
 . Joseph H. Sloss (D)

Arkansas 
 . James M. Hanks (D)
 . Oliver P. Snyder (R)
 . John Edwards (LR), until February 9, 1872
 Thomas Boles (R), from February 9, 1872

California 
 . Sherman O. Houghton (R)
 . Aaron A. Sargent (R)
 . John M. Coghlan (R)

Connecticut 
 . Julius L. Strong (R), until September 7, 1872
 Joseph R. Hawley (R), from December 2, 1872
 . Stephen W. Kellogg (R)
 . Henry H. Starkweather (R)
 . William H. Barnum (D)

Delaware 
 . Benjamin T. Biggs (D)

Florida 
 . Josiah T. Walls (R), until January 29, 1873
 Silas L. Niblack (D), from January 29, 1873

Georgia 
 . Archibald T. MacIntyre (D)
 . Richard H. Whiteley (R)
 . John S. Bigby (R)
 . Thomas J. Speer (R), until August 18, 1872
 Erasmus W. Beck (D), from December 2, 1872
 . Dudley M. Du Bose (D)
 . William P. Price (D)
 . Pierce M. B. Young (D)

Illinois 
 . Charles B. Farwell (R)
 . John F. Farnsworth (R)
 . Horatio C. Burchard (R)
 . John B. Hawley (R)
 . Bradford N. Stevens (D)
 . Burton C. Cook (R), until August 26, 1871
 Henry Snapp (R), from December 4, 1871
 . Jesse H. Moore (R)
 . James C. Robinson (D)
 . Thompson W. McNeely (D)
 . Edward Y. Rice (D)
 . Samuel S. Marshall (D)
 . John B. Hay (R)
 . John M. Crebs (D)
 . John L. Beveridge (R), November 7, 1871 – January 4, 1873

Indiana 
 . William E. Niblack (D)
 . Michael C. Kerr (D)
 . William S. Holman (D)
 . Jeremiah M. Wilson (R)
 . John Coburn (R)
 . Daniel W. Voorhees (D)
 . Mahlon D. Manson (D)
 . James N. Tyner (R)
 . John P. C. Shanks (R)
 . William Williams (R)
 . Jasper Packard (R)

Iowa 
 . George W. McCrary (R)
 . Aylett R. Cotton (R)
 . William G. Donnan (R)
 . Madison M. Walden (R)
 . Francis W. Palmer (R)
 . Jackson Orr (R)

Kansas 
 . David P. Lowe (R)

Kentucky 
 . Edward Crossland (D)
 . Henry D. McHenry (D)
 . Joseph H. Lewis (D)
 . William B. Read (D)
 . Boyd Winchester (D)
 . William E. Arthur (D)
 . James B. Beck (D)
 . George M. Adams (D)
 . John M. Rice (D)

Louisiana 
 . J. Hale Sypher (R)
 . Lionel A. Sheldon (R)
 . Chester B. Darrall (R)
 . James McCleery (R), until November 5, 1871
 Alexander Boarman (LR), from December 3, 1872
 . Frank Morey (R)

Maine 
 . John Lynch (R)
 . William P. Frye (R)
 . James G. Blaine (R)
 . John A. Peters (R)
 . Eugene Hale (R)

Maryland 
 . Samuel Hambleton (D)
 . Stevenson Archer (D)
 . Thomas Swann (D)
 . John Ritchie (D)
 . William M. Merrick (D)

Massachusetts 
 . James Buffington (R)
 . Oakes Ames (R)
 . Ginery Twichell (R)
 . Samuel Hooper (R)
 . Benjamin F. Butler (R)
 . Nathaniel P. Banks (R) then (LR)
 . George M. Brooks (R), until May 13, 1872
 Constantine C. Esty (R), from December 2, 1872
 . George F. Hoar (R)
 . William B. Washburn (R), until December 5, 1871
 Alvah Crocker (R), from January 2, 1872
 . Henry L. Dawes (R)

Michigan 
 . Henry Waldron (R)
 . William L. Stoughton (R)
 . Austin Blair (R)
 . Wilder D. Foster (R), from December 4, 1871
 . Omar D. Conger (R)
 . Jabez G. Sutherland (D)

Minnesota 
 . Mark H. Dunnell (R)
 . John T. Averill (R)

Mississippi 
 . George E. Harris (R)
 . Joseph L. Morphis (R)
 . Henry W. Barry (R)
 . George C. McKee (R)
 . Legrand W. Perce (R)

Missouri 
 . Erastus Wells (D)
 . Gustavus A. Finkelnburg (LR)
 . James R. McCormick (D)
 . Harrison E. Havens (R)
 . Samuel S. Burdett (R)
 . Abram Comingo (D)
 . Isaac C. Parker (R)
 . James G. Blair (LR)
 . Andrew King (D)

Nebraska 
 . John Taffe (R)

Nevada 
 . Charles W. Kendall (D)

New Hampshire 
 . Ellery A. Hibbard (D)
 . Samuel N. Bell (D)
 . Hosea W. Parker (D)

New Jersey 
 . John W. Hazelton (R)
 . Samuel C. Forker (D)
 . John T. Bird (D)
 . John Hill (R)
 . George A. Halsey (R)

New York 
 . Dwight Townsend (D)
 . Thomas Kinsella (D)
 . Henry W. Slocum (D)
 . Robert Roosevelt (D)
 . William R. Roberts (D)
 . Samuel S. Cox (D)
 . Smith Ely Jr. (D)
 . James Brooks (D)
 . Fernando Wood (D)
 . Clarkson N. Potter (D)
 . Charles St. John (R)
 . John H. Ketcham (R)
 . Joseph H. Tuthill (D)
 . Eli Perry (D)
 . Joseph M. Warren (D)
 . John Rogers (D)
 . William A. Wheeler (R)
 . John M. Carroll (D)
 . Elizur H. Prindle (R)
 . Clinton L. Merriam (R)
 . Ellis H. Roberts (R)
 . William E. Lansing (R)
 . R. Holland Duell (R)
 . John E. Seeley (R)
 . William H. Lamport (R)
 . Milo Goodrich (R)
 . H. Boardman Smith (R)
 . Freeman Clarke (R)
 . Seth Wakeman (R)
 . William Williams (D)
 . Walter L. Sessions (R)

North Carolina 
 . Clinton L. Cobb (R)
 . Charles R. Thomas (R)
 . Alfred M. Waddell (D)
 . Sion H. Rogers (D)
 . James M. Leach (D)
 . Francis E. Shober (D)
 . James C. Harper (D)

Ohio 
 . Aaron F. Perry (R), until July 14, 1872
 Ozro J. Dodds (D), from October 9, 1872
 . Job E. Stevenson (R)
 . Lewis D. Campbell (D)
 . John F. McKinney (D)
 . Charles N. Lamison (D)
 . John A. Smith (R)
 . Samuel Shellabarger (R)
 . John Beatty (R)
 . Charles Foster (R)
 . Erasmus D. Peck (R)
 . John T. Wilson (R)
 . Philadelph Van Trump (D)
 . George W. Morgan (D)
 . James Monroe (R)
 . William P. Sprague (R)
 . John Bingham (R)
 . Jacob A. Ambler (R)
 . William H. Upson (R)
 . James A. Garfield (R)

Oregon 
 . James H. Slater (D)

Pennsylvania 
 . Samuel J. Randall (D)
 . John V. Creely (IR)
 . Leonard Myers (R)
 . William D. Kelley (R)
 . Alfred C. Harmer (R)
 . Ephraim L. Acker (D)
 . Washington Townsend (R)
 . J. Lawrence Getz (D)
 . Oliver J. Dickey (R)
 . John W. Killinger (R)
 . John B. Storm (D)
 . Lazarus D. Shoemaker (R)
 . Ulysses Mercur (R), until December 2, 1872
 Frank C. Bunnell (R), from December 24, 1872
 . John B. Packer (R)
 . Richard J. Haldeman (D)
 . Benjamin F. Meyers (D)
 . R. Milton Speer (D)
 . Henry Sherwood (D)
 . Glenni W. Scofield (R)
 . Samuel Griffith (D)
 . Henry D. Foster (D)
 . James S. Negley (R)
 . Ebenezer McJunkin (R)
 . William McClelland (D)

Rhode Island 
 . Benjamin T. Eames (R)
 . James M. Pendleton (R)

South Carolina 
 . Joseph Rainey (R)
 . Robert C. De Large (R), until January 24, 1873; vacant thereafter
 . Robert B. Elliott (R)
 . Alexander S. Wallace (R)

Tennessee 
 . Roderick R. Butler (R)
 . Horace Maynard (R)
 . Abraham E. Garrett (D)
 . John M. Bright (D)
 . Edward I. Golladay (D)
 . Washington C. Whitthorne (D)
 . Robert P. Caldwell (D)
 . William W. Vaughan (D)

Texas 
 . William S. Herndon (D)
 . John C. Conner (D)
 . William T. Clark (R), until May 13, 1872
 Dewitt C. Giddings (D), from May 13, 1872
 . John Hancock (D)

Vermont 
 . Charles W. Willard (R)
 . Luke P. Poland (R)
 . Worthington C. Smith (R)

Virginia 
 . John Critcher (D)
 . James H. Platt Jr. (R)
 . Charles H. Porter (R)
 . William H. H. Stowell (R)
 . Richard T. W. Duke (D)
 . John T. Harris (D)
 . Elliott M. Braxton (D)
 . William Terry (D)

West Virginia 
 . John J. Davis (D)
 . James C. McGrew (R)
 . Frank Hereford (D)

Wisconsin 
 . Alexander Mitchell (D)
 . Gerry W. Hazelton (R)
 . J. Allen Barber (R)
 . Charles A. Eldredge (D)
 . Philetus Sawyer (R)
 . Jeremiah M. Rusk (R)

Non-voting members 
 . Richard C. McCormick (D)
 . Jerome B. Chaffee (R)
 . Moses K. Armstrong (D)
 . Norton P. Chipman (R), from April 21, 1871
 . Samuel A. Merritt (D)
 . William H. Clagett (R)
 . José Manuel Gallegos (D)
 . William H. Hooper (D)
 . Selucius Garfielde (R)
 . William T. Jones (R)

Changes in membership
The count below reflects changes from the beginning of the first session of this Congress.

Senate 
 Replacements: 0
 Democratic: no net change
 Republican: no net change
 Deaths: 0
 Resignations: 2
 Contested elections: 0
Total seats with changes: 4

|-
| Virginia (2)
| Vacant
| Legislature had failed to elect.Previous incumbent re-elected March 15, 1871.
| nowrap  | John W. Johnston (D)
| March 15, 1871

|-
| Georgia (2)
| Vacant
| Foster Blodgett presented credentials as Senator-elect, but the Senate declared him not elected.Successor elected November 14, 1871.
| nowrap  | Thomas M. Norwood (D)
| November 14, 1871

|-
| Mississippi (2)
| Vacant
| Delayed taking seat in order to serve as Governor of Mississippi 
| nowrap  | James L. Alcorn (R)
| December 1, 1871

|-
| North Carolina (2)
| Vacant
| Legislature had failed to elect.Successor elected January 30, 1872.
|  | Matt W. Ransom (D)
| January 30, 1872

|-
| Kentucky (3)
| nowrap  | Garrett Davis (D)
| Died September 22, 1872.Successor appointed September 27, 1872.Appointee was later elected January 21, 1873, to finish the term.
|  | Willis B. Machen (D)
| September 27, 1872

|-
| Louisiana (3)
| nowrap  | William P. Kellogg (R)
| Resigned November 1, 1872, after being elected Governor of Louisiana
| Vacant
| Not filled this Congress

|-
| Massachusetts (2)
| nowrap  | Henry Wilson (R)
| Resigned March 3, 1873, after being elected U.S. Vice President
| Vacant
| Not filled this Congress

|}

House of Representatives 
 Replacements: 11
 Democratic: 4 seat net gain
 Republican: 5 seat net loss
 Liberal Republican: 1 seat net gain
 Deaths: 3
 Resignations: 6
 Contested election: 4
Total seats with changes: 16

|-
| 
| New seat
| style="font-size:80%" | District of Columbia's At-large district created March 4, 1871, and remained vacant until April 21, 1871 
| nowrap  | Norton P. Chipman (R)
| April 21, 1871
|-
| 
| Vacant
| style="font-size:80%" | Rep. John A. Logan resigned at the end of the previous congress after being elected to the US Senate
| nowrap  | John L. Beveridge (R)
| November 7, 1871
|-
| 
| Vacant
| style="font-size:80%" | Rep. Thomas W. Ferry resigned at the end of the previous congress after being elected to the US Senate
| nowrap  | Wilder D. Foster (R)
| December 4, 1871
|-
| 
| nowrap  | Burton C. Cook (R)
| style="font-size:80%" | Resigned August 26, 1871
| nowrap  | Henry Snapp (R)
| December 4, 1871
|-
| 
| nowrap  | James McCleery (R)
| style="font-size:80%" | Died November 5, 1871
| nowrap  | Alexander Boarman (LR)
| December 3, 1872
|-
| 
| nowrap  | William B. Washburn (R)
| style="font-size:80%" | Resigned December 5, 1871, after being elected Governor of Massachusetts
| nowrap  | Alvah Crocker (R)
| January 2, 1872
|-
| 
| nowrap  | John Edwards (LR)
| style="font-size:80%" | Lost contested election February 9, 1872
| nowrap  | Thomas Boles (R)
| February 9, 1872
|-
| 
| nowrap  | George M. Brooks (R)
| style="font-size:80%" | Resigned May 13, 1872, after becoming judge of probate for Middlesex County
| nowrap  | Constantine C. Esty (R)
| December 2, 1872
|-
| 
| nowrap  | William T. Clark (R)
| style="font-size:80%" | Lost contested election May 13, 1872
| nowrap  | Dewitt C. Giddings (D)
| December 13, 1872
|-
| 
| nowrap  | Aaron F. Perry (R)
| style="font-size:80%" | Resigned July 14, 1872
| nowrap  | Ozro J. Dodds (D)
| October 9, 1872
|-
| 
| nowrap  | Thomas J. Speer (R)
| style="font-size:80%" | Died August 18, 1872
| nowrap  | Erasmus W. Beck (D)
| December 2, 1872
|-
| 
| nowrap  | Julius L. Strong (R)
| style="font-size:80%" | Died September 7, 1872
| nowrap  | Joseph R. Hawley (R)
| December 2, 1872
|-
| 
| nowrap  | Ulysses Mercur (R)
| style="font-size:80%" | Resigned December 2, 1872, after becoming an assoc. justice of the Supreme Court of Pennsylvania
| nowrap  | Frank C. Bunnell (R)
| December 24, 1872
|-
| 
| nowrap  | John L. Beveridge (R)
| style="font-size:80%" | Resigned January 4, 1873, after being elected Lieutenant Governor of Illinois
| Vacant
| Not filled this term
|-
| 
| nowrap  | Robert C. De Large (R)
| style="font-size:80%" | Seat declared vacant January 24, 1873, after election was contested by Christopher C. Bowen
| Vacant
| Not filled this term
|-
| 
| nowrap  | Josiah T. Walls (R)
| style="font-size:80%" | Lost contested election January 29, 1873
| nowrap  | Silas L. Niblack (D)
| January 29, 1873
|}

Committees

Senate

 Agriculture (Chairman: Frederick T. Frelinghuysen; Ranking Member: Henry G. Davis)
 Appropriations (Chairman: Lot M. Morrill; Ranking Member: William Windom)
 Audit and Control the Contingent Expenses of the Senate (Chairman: Matthew H. Carpenter; Ranking Member: Eli Saulsbury)
 Civil Service and Retrenchment (Chairman: George G. Wright; Ranking Member: N/A)
 Claims (Chairman: John Scott; Ranking Member: Arthur I. Boreman)
 Commerce (Chairman: Zachariah Chandler; Ranking Member: William A. Buckingham)
 Distributing Public Revenue Among the States (Select)
 District of Columbia (Chairman: John F. Lewis; Ranking Member: Frederick A. Sawyer)
 Education and Labor (Chairman: James W. Flanagan; Ranking Member: James W. Patterson)
 Engrossed Bills (Chairman: Thomas F. Bayard; Ranking Member: Thomas M. Norwood)
 Finance (Chairman: John Sherman; Ranking Member: Adelbert Ames)
 Foreign Relations (Chairman: Simon Cameron; Ranking Member: Carl Schurz)
 Indian Affairs (Chairman: William A. Buckingham; Ranking Member: Henry Wilson)
 Investigation and Retrenchment (Chairman: William A. Buckingham; Ranking Member; William M. Stewart)
 Judiciary (Chairman: George F. Edmunds; Ranking Member: Frederick T. Frelinghuysen) 
 Manufactures (Chairman: Thomas J. Robertson; Ranking Member: Abijah Gilbert)
 Military Affairs (Chairman: John A. Logan; Ranking Member: John A. Logan)
 Mines and Mining (Chairman: Hannibal Hamlin; Ranking Member: Alexander Caldwell)
 Mississippi River Levee System (Select)
 Naval Affairs (Chairman: Aaron H. Cragin; Ranking Member: Thomas W. Ferry)
 Ordnance and War Ships (Select)
 Outrages in Southern States (Select)
 Pacific Railroad (Chairman: William M. Stewart; Ranking Member: William P. Kellogg) 
 Patents (Chairman: Orris S. Ferry; Ranking Member: William Windom)
 Pensions (Chairman: Daniel D. Pratt; Ranking Member: Morgan C. Hamilton)
 Post Office and Post Roads (Chairman: Alexander Ramsey; Ranking Member: Hannibal Hamlin)
 Private Land Claims (Chairman: Allen G. Thurman; Ranking Member: Thomas F. Bayard)
 Privileges and Elections (Chairman: Oliver P. Morton; Ranking Member: Joshua Hill)
 Public Buildings and Grounds (Chairman: Justin S. Morrill; Ranking Member: Cornelius Cole)
 Public Lands (Chairman: William Sprague; Ranking Member: William Windom)
 Railroads (Chairman: William M. Stewart; Ranking Member: N/A)
 Removal of Political Disabilities (Select)
 Retrenchment
 Revision of the Laws (Chairman: Hannibal Hamlin; Ranking Member: George G. Wright)
 Revolutionary Claims (Chairman: William G. Brownlow; Ranking Member: Joshua Hill)
 Rules (Select)
 Tariff Regulation (Select)
 Territories (Chairman: Arthur I. Boreman; Ranking Member: Phineas W. Hitchcock)
 Transportation Routes to the Seaboard (Select)
 Whole

House of Representatives

 Accounts (Chairman: James Buffington; Ranking Member: Stevenson Archer)
 Agriculture (Chairman: Charles Hays; Ranking Member: John W. Hazelton)
 Appropriations (Chairman: James A. Garfield; Ranking Member: Eugene Hale)
 Alabama Affairs (Select)
 Arkansas Affairs (Select)
 Banking and Currency (Chairman: Horace Maynard; Ranking Member: Clinton L. Merriam) 
 Claims (Chairman: John B. Hawley; Ranking Member: William P. Frye)
 Coinage, Weights and Measures (Chairman: Samuel Hooper; Ranking Member: John Critcher)
 Commerce (Chairman: William A. Wheeler; Ranking Member: James S. Negley)
 District of Columbia (Chairman: Alfred C. Harmer; Ranking Member: Aylett R. Cotton)
 Education and Labor (Chairman: James Monroe; Ranking Member: Robert B. Elliott)
 Elections (Chairman: Horace B. Smith; Ranking Member: Benjamin T. Eames)
 Expenditures in the Interior Department (Chairman: Jackson Orr; Ranking Member: George M. Adams)
 Expenditures in the Justice Department (Chairman: James B. Sener; Ranking Member: N/A)
 Expenditures in the Navy Department (Chairman: Julius C. Burrows; Ranking Member: Benjamin T. Biggs)
 Expenditures in the Post Office Department (Chairman: Henry W. Barry; Ranking Member: William R. Roberts)
 Expenditures in the State Department (Chairman: Jasper Packard; Ranking Member: John Rogers)
 Expenditures in the Treasury Department (Chairman: J. Hale Sypher; Ranking Member: William H. Barnum)
 Expenditures in the War Department (Chairman: William Williams; Ranking Member: Ephraim L. Acker)
 Expenditures on Public Buildings (Chairman: R. Holland Duell; Ranking Member: Fernando Wood)
 Freedmen's Affairs (Chairman: Clinton L. Cobb; Ranking Member: Joseph H. Rainey)
 Foreign Affairs (Chairman: Godlove Stein Orth; Ranking Member: Jasper Packard)
 Indian Affairs (Chairman: John T. Averill; Ranking Member: John C. Edwards)
 Invalid Pensions (Chairman: Jeremiah McLain Rusk; Ranking Member: Benjamin S. Turner)
 Judiciary (Chairman: Benjamin F. Butler; Ranking Member: Milo Goodrich) 
 Manufactures (Chairman: Charles B. Farwell; Ranking Member: John M. Rice)
 Mileage (Chairman: Hezekiah S. Bundy; Ranking Member: Edward I. Golladay)
 Military Affairs (Chairman: John Coburn; Ranking Member: George E. Harris)
 Militia (Chairman: Roderick R. Butler; Ranking Member: John C. Conner)
 Mines and Mining (Chairman: David P. Lowe; Ranking Member: Walter L. Sessions)
 Naval Affairs (Chairman: Glenni W. Scofield; Ranking Member: John M. Coghlan)
 Pacific Railroads (Chairman: Philetus Sawyer; Ranking Member: John T. Averill)
 Patents (Chairman: Omar D. Conger; Ranking Member: Joseph M. Warren)
 Post Office and Post Roads (Chairman: John B. Packer; Ranking Member: Charles H. Porter)
 Private Land Claims (Chairman: Jasper Packard; Ranking Member: J. Allen Barber)
 Public Buildings and Grounds (Chairman: James H. Platt Jr.; Ranking Member: Walter L. Sessions)
 Public Expenditures (Chairman: Harrison E. Havens; Ranking Member: Thomas Kinsella)
 Public Lands (Chairman: Washington Townsend; Ranking Member: Jeremiah M. Rusk)
 Railways and Canals (Chairman: George W. McCrary; Ranking Member: Charles St. John
 Reform on Civil Service (Chairman: Stephen W. Kellogg; Ranking Member: N/A)
 Revision of Laws (Chairman: Luke P. Poland; Ranking Member: John S. Bigby)
 Revolution Claims (Chairman: Alexander S. Wallace; Ranking Member: Abram Comingo)
 Revolutionary Pensions and War of 1812 (Chairman: Lazarus D. Shoemaker; Ranking Member: John M. Rice)
 Rules (Select) (Chairman: James G. Blaine; Ranking Member: Samuel S. Cox)
 Standards of Official Conduct
 Territories (Chairman: George C. McKee; Ranking Member: Lazarus D. Shoemaker)
 War Claims (Chairman: William Lawrence; Ranking Member: N/A)
 Ways and Means (Chairman: Henry L. Dawes; Ranking Member: Horatio C. Burchard)
 Whole

Joint committees

 Conditions of Indian Tribes (Special)
 Enrolled Bills (Chairman: Rep. Chester B. Darrall; Vice Chairman: Rep. John T. Bird)
 Inquire into the Affairs of the District of Columbia (Select) (Chairman: Rep. Jeremiah M. Wilson; Vice Chairman: N/A)
 The Library (Chairman: Rep. William P. Frye; Vice Chairman: Rep. Lewis D. Campbell)
 Printing (Chairman: Rep. William G. Donnan; Vice Chairman: Rep. William P. Price)

Caucuses
 Democratic (House)
 Democratic (Senate)

Employees

Legislative branch agency directors
Architect of the Capitol:  Edward Clark
Librarian of Congress: Ainsworth Rand Spofford

Senate 
Chaplain: John P. Newman (Methodist)
Librarian: George S. Wagner, from 1871
 Secretary: George C. Gorham
Sergeant at Arms:  John R. French

House of Representatives 
Chaplain: John G. Butler (Presbyterian)
Clerk: Edward McPherson
Clerk at the Speaker's Table: John M. Barclay
Doorkeeper:  Otis S. Buxton
Postmaster: William S. King
Reading Clerks: Charles N. Clisbee (D) and William K. Mehaffey (R)
Sergeant at Arms:  Nehemiah G. Ordway

See also 
 1870 United States elections (elections leading to this Congress)
 1870–71 United States Senate elections
 1870–71 United States House of Representatives elections
 1972 United States elections (elections during this Congress, leading to the next Congress)
 1872 United States presidential election
 1872–73 United States Senate elections
 1872–73 United States House of Representatives elections

Notes

References

External links
Statutes at Large, 1789-1875
Senate Journal, First Forty-three Sessions of Congress
House Journal, First Forty-three Sessions of Congress
Biographical Directory of the U.S. Congress
U.S. House of Representatives: House History
U.S. Senate: Statistics and Lists